Alexandra Ann Wehrley (known professionally as Alex Wehrley; born July 29, 1987) is an American YouTuber, TV host, and former Miss Wisconsin USA.

Wehrley is best known for co-hosting the 2015 Miss USA pageant.

Early life 
In 2009, Wehrley graduated from the University of Wisconsin–Madison with a B.A. in communications.

Career 
Wehrley has hosted TV shows for multiple platforms, including Tribune Media’s Eye Opener, as well as the talk show Oklahoma LIVE. After heading to Hollywood, she began working as a freelancer for E! News Now and has also co-hosted the CMA Awards red carpet and VH1’s Big Morning Buzz with Nick Lachey.

Wehrley currently co-hosts Discover Wisconsin.

Personal life
In 2015, Wehrley married Charlie Berens, who is a comedian, a journalist, and the creator of "Manitowoc Minute". They divorced in late 2020.

In May 2022, Wehrley became engaged to her boyfriend, Joe Wnuk. They married later the same year, in October 2022.

See also

References

Bibliography

External links
 

1988 births
Living people
People from Elm Grove, Wisconsin
University of Wisconsin–Madison School of Journalism & Mass Communication alumni
Actresses from Wisconsin
Journalists from Wisconsin
Women in Wisconsin
21st-century American actresses